Karez-i-Mulla (also known as Karez-e-Mulla) is a village located in Herat, Afghanistan.  The village and Kundur are mostly Mogholi speaking and are inhabited by the Moghol people.

References 

Populated places in Herat Province
Villages in Afghanistan